Peetu Piiroinen (born 15 February 1988) is a Finnish snowboarder. He is a three-time Olympian representing Finland in snowboarding at the 2010 Winter Olympics, 2014 Winter Olympics and 2018 Winter Olympics. Peetu made the finals in all 3 Olympics and won the silver medal at the 2010 Games.

Personal life
Living in Hyvinkää, Finland, with his home mountain being Sveitsin Hiihtokeskus, Peetu has been travelling the world competing since 1997.

He consistently competes in the TTR World Tour and is currently one of the best snowboarders in the world.
He finished 2nd in the Winter Olympics halfpipe event in 2010. He has so far now won three TTR World Tours in a row. He is the first one to do this.

He is the older brother of fellow snowboarder Petja Piiroinen.

Career
He won the 2008/2009 Swatch TTR World Snowboard Championship and received much favourable press in his native country of Finland. In 2009/10, Peetu Piiroinen has carved his name into the history book of snowboarding by becoming the first snowboarder ever to win two consecutive Swatch TTR World Champion titles. As if re-claiming the most prestigious award in snowboarding was not enough, he also secured it a week before the last 6Star event, the Burton US Open. Piiroinen took an unassailable lead in the TTR World Ranking List with a win in the slopestyle at the 6Star Oakley Arctic Challenge in Oslo, Norway, on March 8, 2010. Along with the title, the 22-year-old Finn has earned himself another TTR prize money worth $50,000 USD and automatic invites to all major TTR events for the 2010/2011 season. In  the 2010 season, Peetu has managed to balance his TTR commitments as well as shine at events outside the TTR tour winning an Olympic silver medal and the title at the Toyota Big Air in Japan.

In the 2007/2008 Swatch TTR World Snowboard Tour, Piiroinen finished ranked World No.3.
He finished 2nd in the Winter Olympics halfpipe event in 2010.
Piiroinen has a sponsorship deal with Nike 6.0.  His other sponsors include Burton, Red, Anon, Battery and 015 Boards and Lifestyle.

References

External links
 
 
 
 
Peetu Piiroinens official Swatch TTR Website

1988 births
Living people
Finnish male snowboarders
Snowboarders at the 2010 Winter Olympics
Snowboarders at the 2014 Winter Olympics
Snowboarders at the 2018 Winter Olympics
X Games athletes
Olympic silver medalists for Finland
Olympic snowboarders of Finland
Olympic medalists in snowboarding
Medalists at the 2010 Winter Olympics
People from Hyvinkää
Sportspeople from Uusimaa